145 may refer to:

145 (number), a natural number
AD 145, a year in the 2nd century AD
145 BC, a year in the 2nd century BC
145 (dinghy), a two-person intermediate sailing dinghy 
145 (South) Brigade
145 (New Jersey bus)

See also
 List of highways numbered 145